Philipp Laux (born 25 January 1973) is a German former footballer, now sports psychologist of Borussia Dortmund.

Playing career
Laux, who played as a goalkeeper, began his senior career in 1993, with Borussia Dortmund. After one year in their reserve team, he moved on to SSV Ulm, of the Regionalliga (level 3). In 1998 the club was promoted to the 2. Bundesliga, which they followed with an immediate promotion to the Bundesliga, the top tier of German football. They went straight back down, but Laux was a key player, the only player in the Ulm squad to play all 34 games that season, and managed to stay in the Bundesliga, rejoining Dortmund at the end of the year. He spent two years back at the Westfalenstadion, serving as reserve goalkeeper as the club won the German title, and reached the UEFA Cup final. He left for Eintracht Braunschweig in 2002, but suffered an injury which forced him to retire from the game.

Coaching career
After retiring, Laux enrolled at the University of Mannheim, to study psychology. He graduated in 2008.

During this time he also worked as a goalkeeper coach. He served the German Football Association from 2004 to 2006, coaching the women's team and the youth team. From 2006 to 2008 he fulfilled a similar role at TSG 1899 Hoffenheim, before joining Bayern Munich as part of Jürgen Klinsmann's new regime, filling the role of sports psychologist. In 2012, he moved to RB Leipzig.

Honours
 Bundesliga: 2002

References

External links
 

1973 births
Living people
People from Rastatt
Sportspeople from Karlsruhe (region)
German footballers
Association football goalkeepers
Bundesliga players
2. Bundesliga players
SSV Ulm 1846 players
Borussia Dortmund players
Borussia Dortmund II players
Eintracht Braunschweig players
FC Bayern Munich non-playing staff
University of Mannheim alumni
Footballers from Baden-Württemberg
West German footballers